Johor Darul Ta'zim II F.C. played the 2021 season in the Malaysia Premier League.

Season overview
 On 7 December 2019, former club's captain, Shakir Shaari has been appointed as club's assistant coach.

 On 8 January 2020, club's technical director, Alistair Edwards announced Kei Hirose from Persela Lamongan and Fernando Rodríguez from Kedah Darul Aman as club's new players.

 On 22 January 2020, the club has been defeated 1-2 to Indonesian side Madura United in a friendly match.

 On 9 October 2020, the club lost 0-1 against Kelantan in a league match.

Competitions

Malaysia Premier League

League table

Squad staticstics

|-
! colspan="16" style="background:#dcdcdc; text-align:center"| Goalkeepers

|-
! colspan="16" style="background:#dcdcdc; text-align:center"| Defenders

|-
! colspan="16" style="background:#dcdcdc; text-align:center"| Midfielders

|-
! colspan="16" style="background:#dcdcdc; text-align:center"| Forwards

|-
! colspan="16" style="background:#dcdcdc; text-align:center"| Players loaned out during the season
|}

References

2020
JDT II